Klon  is a village in the administrative district of Gmina Czajków, within Ostrzeszów County, Greater Poland Voivodeship, in west-central Poland.

References

Klon